SV Bonlanden is a German association football club from the district of Bonlanden in the town of Filderstadt.

History
The association was founded on 4 August 1895 as the gymnastics club Turnverein Bonländer and soon developed an athletics department. They united with another local gymnastics club, Freie Turnerschaft 1908 Bonlanden, in 1911.

Other local footballers established the club Fussball Club Pfeil in 1921, which was followed sometime later by the formation of Rot Sport which held a communist political ideology. In 1930 TV saw its newly formed football department briefly go its own way as Arbeiter Sportverein Bonlanden before it became part of Rot Sport. Under the policies of the Third Reich, sports associations with left-leaning or religious affiliations were consolidated for political reasons and these teams were joined together in 1933 as Turngemeinde Bonlanden. Following World War II, occupying Allied authorities ordered the dissolution of most organizations in the country, including sports and football associations. The old club was re-established on 7 September 1945 as Sportverein Bonlanden.

Football did not become prominent within the sports club until the late 70s, and through the 80s the team played lower tier amateur ball. In 1988, Bonlanden won promotion to the Verbandsliga Württemberg (V) for a two-year stint. They were again promoted in 1994 and celebrated their centenary by winning their way to the Oberliga Baden-Württemberg (IV) the following season. The club enjoyed its most successful campaign in 1996 with a state cup win in the Württemberg Pokal, which earned a first round appearance in DFB Pokal (German Cup) play where the side was put out 2:4 by VfL Bochum.

Bonlanden spent six seasons in the Oberliga until being relegated in 2001 and has since played as an "elevator club" moving frequently up and down between fourth- and fifth-tier play. The club shuttled between Verbandliga and Oberliga with regularity from 1995 to 2012, but was eventually relegated from the Verbandsliga to the Landesliga in 2014 after coming last in the league. The 2015–16 season saw the club finish on a relegation rank in the Landesliga and dropping down to the Bezirksliga.

Honours
The club's honours:

League
 Verbandsliga Württemberg
 Champions: (5) 1995, 2002, 2006, 2009, 2011

Cup
 Württemberg Cup
 Winners: 1996

Recent seasons
The recent season-by-season performance of the club:

 With the introduction of the Regionalligas in 1994 and the 3. Liga in 2008 as the new third tier, below the 2. Bundesliga, all leagues below dropped one tier.

Stadium
SV Bonlanden play their home matches in the Stadion an der Humboldtstraße which has a capacity of 2,000.

References

External links
Official team site
Das deutsche Fußball-Archiv historical German domestic league tables 
SV Bonlanden at Weltfussball.de

Football clubs in Germany
Football clubs in Baden-Württemberg
Association football clubs established in 1895
1895 establishments in Germany